Gramm may refer to:

Gramm (record label), Icelandic record label
Gramm (surname)
Gramm,  Jan Jelinek, German musician
Gramm, Wyoming, an unincorporated community

See also
Gramm–Leach–Bliley Act, an Act of the United States Congress
Gramm-Latta Budget, a bill passed by the United States Congress
Graham (disambiguation)
Gram (disambiguation)
Grammy Award